The Rafael Hernández National College is one of the four public high schools that are part of the National University of La Plata, in the City of La Plata, Argentina. The Colegio Nacional aegis denotes a school belonging to the system of national secondary schools. The other constituent high schools associated with this university are the Víctor Mercante Lyceum, the "Bachillerato de Bellas Artes" (High School for the Fine Arts) and the Inchausti School for Agricultural Education.

The school, usually referred to as the "Colegio Nacional La Plata" (CNLP, National College of La Plata), occupies a large block centred at the crossing of 1st and 49th streets in La Plata, at the edge of "El Bosque", La Plata's main park. The large engraving at the old building's entrance reads simply "Universidad Nacional, Colegio" ("National University, High School").

Originally, the college, founded by Joaquín V. González, was reserved for boys, whereas the Victor Mercante Lyceum was a girls-only school. The link of these schools with the university allowed them to pioneer innovations in curricula, since many university professors and teaching assistants were among its faculty. In its inception, the college functioned as a classic British boarding school, where students and professors lived together for extended periods of time. Admission into the school was free (i.e., no fees), although very limited and required approving strict entrance examinations. Until the 1970s, alumni from the school were automatically admitted into the University of La Plata. From the educational point of view, it was originally structured as a European gymnasium. It is considered one of the most prestigious secondary schools in Argentina.

History

The Beginnings
The city of La Plata was founded in 1882, as the new capital for the Province of Buenos Aires. A boys-only school is created in 1885, the "Provincial High School", associated with the National College of Buenos Aires; classes began on April 1, 1885.  The federal government converted the school into the National College of La Plata in July 1887; its first rector was Dr. Matías Calandrelli. The high school became affiliated with the National University of La Plata in 1905.

Locations
Classes began at a temporary location at the corner of 9th and 47th streets.

In 1886, the college was moved to a provincial building at the corner of 17th Street and 51st Avenue.

Between 1907 and 1910, the highschool was located at the present site of the "Escuela  Provincial Nº 1" and "Escuela Normal Nº 3", at the corner of 8th and 57th streets.

In 1905, the national government granted lots for the new (and definitive) placement of the school. The land originally assigned to the college were much larger, and covered areas that are assigned today to other facilities of the University of La Plata.

The college building was officially inaugurated in September 1910; it was known simply as "Colegio Nacional de la Universidad Nacional de La Plata". The instruction was inspired in a classic English boarding school; it included nearby residences for students and professors, the so-called “Greek Temple” gymnasium behind the school, and access to yachting at the central channel of the Port of La Plata. Its building, recently restored, has been named a heritage site.

The school was later named after Rafael Hernández, a journalist, agricultural engineer, soldier, and politician who spearheaded the founding of the City and Port of La Plata, as well as its university. He was the younger brother of José Hernández, the author of the epic poem Martín Fierro.

The building underwent extensive restoration on the occasion of its centennial in 2005, supported by the President of Argentina at the time, the late Néstor Kirchner, whose family is among the alumni.

Notable alumni
 1887: Juana Cortelezzi (geologist, first woman full professor at the National University of La Plata)
 1897: Julieta Lanteri (physician, first woman to enroll in and graduate from the institution)
 1928: Ernesto Sábato (novelist)
 1937: Horacio Etchegoyen (psychoanalyst)
 1941: René Favaloro (physician, first surgeon to perform bypass surgery on a patient suffering from coronary artery disease, and a key contributor to the modern surgical technique.)
 1959: David Graiver (financier)
 1945: Sergio Karakachoff (lawyer and human rights worker)
2000: Lucio Cinti (rugby player)

List of School Headmasters ("Rectors")

References

External links
 Website of Colegio Nacional Rafael Hernández (in Spanish)

Secondary schools in Argentina
Educational institutions established in 1885
School buildings completed in 1910
Buildings and structures in La Plata
Education in Buenos Aires Province
National University of La Plata
1885 establishments in Argentina